Petrino is a village in the northern part of the Resen Municipality of North Macedonia. The village is deserted.

Demographics
The last census in which Petrino still had permanent residents was in 1971.

References

Villages in Resen Municipality
fr:Otechevo